The Piqua Nuclear Power Facility was an organic cooled and moderated nuclear reactor which operated just outside the southern city limits of Piqua, Ohio in the United States.  The plant contained a 45.5-megawatt (thermal) organically cooled and moderated nuclear reactor (terphenyl, a biphenyl like oil).  The Piqua facility was built and operated between 1963 and 1966 as a demonstration project by the Atomic Energy Commission.  The facility ceased operation in 1966.  It was dismantled between 1967 and 1969, and the radioactive coolant and most other radioactive materials were removed. The remaining radioactive structural components of the reactor were entombed in the reactor vessel under sand and concrete.

Background

The plant was first proposed February 1, 1956 when the local public utility company in Piqua, Ohio proposed to build a 12,500 kilowatt nuclear power plant using an organically moderated reactor by asking to join the U.S. government's small reactor construction program which provided joint government-utility participation. It was in response to the second round of the Atomic Energy Commission's (AEC) Power Demonstration Reactor Program.  The six other municipalities who applied were revealed when Senator Clinton P. Anderson of New Mexico accused the AEC of trying to impose an 'absolute Iron Curtain around thought' regarding nuclear secrecy.  At the same committee meeting the locations of the seven proposed power plants were announced:

 Anchorage, Alaska
 Elk River, Minnesota
 Gainesville, Florida
 Hersey, Michigan
 Holyoke, Massachusetts
 Piqua, Ohio
 Orlando, Florida

By September 27, 1956 the AEC authorized contract negotiations for the $8M plant.  $4M would come from the AEC to finance the reactor construction and $4M would be from the city of Piqua for facilities, land and building.  The Atomics International division of North American Aviation was selected to design the plant. Their experience building and operating the Organic Moderated Reactor Experiment uniquely qualified them for the job.

Plant operating events
As the plant was only in operation for three years, a summary of key operating events is included

Technical problems 
In 1966, problems with control rods and fouling in cooling surfaces led to ceased operations. The neutron flux within the reactor core induced polymerization of Terphenyl, leading to increased viscosity of the coolant and fouling.

Plant decommissioning 

After the plant ceased operations in 1966, Atomics International was performing work that would allow the plant to restart operations. However, the AEC decided to terminate the operating contract, citing higher-priority needs for manpower and funding, lack of programmatic interest, and technical problems. The site's buildings were decontaminated, except for the containment vessel, which was entombed in concrete.

Ongoing environmental inspections and dose reconstruction projects have been undertaken by the CDC and other entities.

Site today

The facility's buildings that were not entombed are now used as a warehouse and office space for the City of Piqua. The US Department of Energy has proposed removal of the dome. The facility is currently being torn down by the City of Piqua.

See also

WR-1
Terphenyl
Santa Susana Field Laboratory

References

External links
 https://www.cdc.gov/niosh/ocas/piqua.html
 https://web.archive.org/web/20100829160656/http://www.em.doe.gov/bemr/bemrsites/pnpf.aspx
 A video describing the Piqua reactor

Energy infrastructure completed in 1963
Buildings and structures in Miami County, Ohio
Nuclear reactors
Nuclear power plants in Ohio
Former nuclear power stations in the United States
Former power stations in Ohio